The Furies  (1930) is an all-talking pre-Code murder mystery film released by First National Pictures, a subsidiary of Warner Bros., and directed by Alan Crosland. The movie stars Lois Wilson, H.B. Warner, Natalie Moorhead and Theodore von Eltz. The film was based on the 1928 play, of the same name, by Zoe Akins.

Plot
 
Fifi Sands (Wilson) is married to Mr. Sands (Love), an unpleasant millionaire, who is constantly cheating on her. Being fed up with his affairs, Mrs. Sands, who is in love with Owen McDonald (von Eltz), asks Mr. Sands for a divorce but he constantly refuses. Mr. Sands's lawyer (Warner), manages to prevent her from filing for divorce for a while.

One evening, at a dinner party given by Smith (Brooke), Fifi announces that her husband has finally granted her a divorce. McDonald, however, is disappointed to find that she did not ask for a settlement or alimony. Later, Alan Sands (Sage), Fifi’s son, discovered that his father had been murdered with poison and accuses McDonald of the deed and chastises his mother for protecting him. Sands' s lawyer accuses McDonald of being a penniless fortune-hunter. This further blackens the case again McDonald. Dr. Cummings, who is the family doctor (Birmingham). is also suspected because of his unusual interest in Fifi.

Fifi is also a suspect because she seems distraught during the dinner party, which occurred on the night that Mr. Sands was murdered. Fifi at first quarrels with Oliver Bedlow (Warner) and orders him out of her house. Later on she turns to him for help. He at first seem uninterested in helping, but when he discovers that Fifi is not in love with McDonald, he agrees to help her. Bedlow then locks the apartment door and begins to discuss the case. Mrs. Sands's loyal servants are coached in their testimony by Bedlow but they are unable to remember their lines. After an intensive investigation of suspects in the death of Mr. Sands, Bedlow breaks down and confesses to the crime. Bedlow declares his love for Fifi, but is rejected and commits suicide by falling out of a window.

Cast
Lois Wilson as Fifi Sands 
H. B. Warner as Oliver Bedlow 
Natalie Moorhead as Caroline Leigh 
Theodore von Eltz as Owen McDonald 
Tyler Brooke as Smith
Purnell Pratt as District Attorney 
Montagu Love as Mr. Sands
Byron Sage as Alan Sands 
Carl Stockdale as Bennett

Preservation status
No film elements are known to survive. The soundtrack, which was recorded on Vitaphone disks, may survive in private hands.

See also
List of lost films

External links

1930 films
First National Pictures films
Lost American films
American mystery films
Warner Bros. films
American black-and-white films
1930 mystery films
1930 lost films
1930s English-language films
1930s American films